Testudomyces is a fungal genus in the family Onygenaceae. This is a monotypic genus, containing the single species Testudomyces verrucosus.

References

External links
 

Onygenales
Monotypic Eurotiomycetes genera
Taxa described in 2002